Chris & Julia's Sunday Night Takeaway (frequently referred to as Sunday Night Takeaway or simply Takeaway) is an Australian television variety show, presented by Chris Brown and Julia Morris. It premiered on Network 10 on 24 February 2019 and airs on Sunday nights. It is based on the British television show, Ant & Dec's Saturday Night Takeaway, created and presented by Anthony McPartlin and Declan Donnelly. The show features a mixture of live and pre-recorded entertainment, quiz segments and competitions. Chris & Julia's Sunday Night Takeaway was filmed at Fox Studios Australia.

Format
Sunday Night Takeaway is a variety show which has a number of segments including 'Undercover', 'In for a Dollar', 'Happiest Minute', 'I'm a Celebrity...Get Out of My Ear!', 'Audience Surprise', 'Little Chris & Julia', 'Home Run', 'Read My Lips', 'Couch Watch', 'Game of Phones', 'Singalong Live', 'Chris vs. Julia' and 'Win the Ads'. These segments and games are mostly adapted from the British version of the show, Ant & Dec's Saturday Night Takeaway, and the different games and segments in the show are similar to or replicas of those on Saturday Night Takeaway.

Takeaway Reheated
From 18 April 2020, Network Ten aired encores of the show during the COVID-19 pandemic on Saturday nights at 6 pm, which included newly filmed content from the homes of Dr Chris Brown, Julia Morris and Beau Ryan. After its second episode, Takeaway Reheated was moved to a new timeslot of Saturdays at 4 pm. Its final episode aired on 23 May 2020.

Ratings

References

External links 
 

Network 10 original programming
Australian variety television shows
2019 Australian television series debuts
2019 Australian television series endings
Television series by ITV Studios
Australian television series based on British television series